Forsyth is a city in Taney County, Missouri, United States. The population was 2,730 at the 2020 census. It is the county seat of Taney County. The town is part of the Branson, Missouri Micropolitan Statistical Area. Forsyth is located on Lake Taneycomo on U.S. Route 160.

History
A post office called Forsyth has been in operation since 1837. The community has the name of John Forsyth, 13th United States Secretary of State.

Geography

Demographics

2010 census
As of the census of 2010, there were 2,255 people, 967 households, and 590 families living in the city. The racial makeup of the city was 96.1% White, 0.3% African American, 0.9% Native American, 0.4% Asian, 0.5% from other races, and 1.8% from two or more races. Hispanic or Latino of any race were 3.0% of the population.

There were 967 households, of which 21.4% had children under the age of 18 living with them, 49.3% were married couples living together, 7.8% had a female householder with no husband present, 3.9% had a male householder with no wife present, and 39.0% were non-families. 34.7% of all households were made up of individuals, and 22.1% had someone living alone who was 65 years of age or older. The average household size was 2.11 and the average family size was 2.68.

The median age in the city was 51.7 years. 16.4% of residents were under the age of 18; 6% were between the ages of 18 and 24; 20% were from 25 to 44; 24.9% were from 45 to 64; and 32.6% were 65 years of age or older. The gender makeup of the city was 47.6% male and 52.4% female.

2000 census
As of the census of 2000, there were 1,686 people, 788 households, and 487 families living in the city. The population density was 824.9 people per square mile (319.1/km2). There were 918 housing units at an average density of 449.2 per square mile (173.7/km2). The racial makeup of the city was 98.58% White, 0.06% African American, 0.30% Native American, 0.18% Asian, 0.42% from other races, and 0.47% from two or more races. Hispanic or Latino of any race were 1.01% of the population.

There were 788 households, out of which 18.4% had children under the age of 18 living with them, 53.7% were married couples living together, 6.5% had a female householder with no husband present, and 38.1% were non-families. 34.8% of all households were made up of individuals, and 20.6% had someone living alone who was 65 years of age or older. The average household size was 2.04 and the average family size was 2.59.

In the city, the population was spread out, with 16.9% under the age of 18, 4.7% from 18 to 24, 20.6% from 25 to 44, 24.3% from 45 to 64, and 33.5% who were 65 years of age or older. The median age was 53 years. For every 100 females, there were 84.9 males. For every 100 females age 18 and over, there were 79.8 males.

The median income for a household in the city was $31,801, and the median income for a family was $39,625. Males had a median income of $30,882 versus $19,183 for females. The per capita income for the city was $21,436. About 5.4% of families and 9.7% of the population were below the poverty line, including 17.3% of those under age 18 and 8.1% of those age 65 or over.

Education
Forsyth R-III School District operates one elementary school, one middle school and Forsyth High School.

Forsyth has a lending library, the Forsyth Public Library.

References

External links 
 Official website

Cities in Taney County, Missouri
County seats in Missouri
Branson, Missouri micropolitan area
Cities in Missouri